Jeromy Melendres Batac (born February 2, 2009), also known mononymously as Jeromy or Jiro, is a Filipino singer and actor. He is known for his participation in Dream Maker, a Filipino-South Korean boy group survival reality show produced by ABS-CBN Entertainment, MLD Entertainment, and KAMP Global, wherein he came in first place in the competition. He is a member of the show's resulting boy group HORI7ON.

Early life and education 
Jeromy Melendres Batac was born in Quezon City, Philippines on February 2, 2009.

Career

Early projects 
According to Batac, his mother saw his potential in dancing once when he performed in his school at 5 years old. He, then, pursued to find a dance coach and started his career in dancing. In 2018, his dance group Electrogroovers won champion in the Australian-based competition World Supremacy Battlegrounds (WSB International Kids Champions), which took place in Sydney, Australia.

In 2017, 8-year-old Batac performed in the variety show Little Big Shots alongside his dance pair Thea.

Dream Maker and HORI7ON 

In 2022, Batac participated in Dream Maker, a reality competition show broadcast on ABS-CBN which produces a boy band from a field of 62 contestants. Batac took the rank 5 seat during the mentors' evaluation. Korean mentor Bae Yoon-Jung gave the highest points to Batac among the contestants, as she commented: "The future of the Philippines is bright because of you". He was then 13 years old and one of the youngest contestants in the show, alongside Marcus Cabais and Prince Encelan. 

Throughout the show, Batac won the missions given to them: he was given Rank A during the 'Theme Song Mentors' Evaluation', he became the youngest leader during the 'Mission 1 – Group Battle' and won against the other group, he received the overall highest points in the dance position during the 'Mission 2 – Position Mission', and his team won the 'Mission 3 – New K-pop Song Launch Mission'. Batac also consistently ranked high and stayed within the Top 7 in every ranking announcement, allowing him to advance to the finals. He is known for finishing first in the final episode and becoming part of the project boy group HORI7ON under MLD Entertainment.

Filmography

Television

References

External links

2009 births
Living people
Filipino singers
People from Quezon City